Martine Audet (born October 15, 1961) is a Canadian poet from Montreal, Quebec. She won the Governor General's Award for French-language poetry at the 2020 Governor General's Awards for her poetry collection La Société des cendres.

She was previously a nominee at the 2000 Governor General's Awards for Orbites, at the 2007 Governor General's Awards for Les manivelles, at the 2011 Governor General's Awards for Je demande pardon à l'espèce qui brille and at the 2015 Governor General's Awards for Tête première / Dos / Contre dos, and won the Prix Alain-Grandbois in 2001 for Les tables.

Selected works
 Poèmes du lendemain (1993)
 Les murs clairs (1996)
 Doublures (1998)
 Orbites (2000)
 Les tables (2001)
 Les mélancolies (2003)
 Que ferais-je du jour (2005)
 Les manivelles (2006)
 L'amour des objets (2009)
 Je demande pardon à l'espèce qui brille (2010)
 Le ciel n'est qu'un détour à brûler (2010)
 Des lames entières (2011)
 Des voix stridentes ou rompues (2013)
 Tête première / Dos / Contre dos (2015)

See also

Canadian literature
Canadian poetry
List of Canadian poets
List of Canadian writers
List of Quebec writers

References

Living people
1961 births
20th-century Canadian poets
21st-century Canadian poets
20th-century Canadian women writers
21st-century Canadian women writers
Writers from Montreal
Canadian women poets
Canadian poets in French
Prix Alain-Grandbois
Governor General's Award-winning poets